Bilinea is a genus of moths of the family Erebidae first described by Michael Fibiger in 2008.

Species
Bilinea bilineata (Hampson, 1907)
Bilinea bilineatissima Fibiger, 2008

References

Micronoctuini
Noctuoidea genera